Trichaptum podocarpi is a species of fungus in the order Hymenochaetales. It differs from species in its genus by having totally resupinate basidiocarps, distinctly long cystidia, and in its habitat on Podocarpus. It was first isolated from China.

References

Further reading
Dai, Yu-Cheng, et al. "Wood-inhabiting fungi in southern China. 4. Polypores from Hainan Province." Annales Botanici Fennici. Vol. 48. No. 3. Finnish Zoological and Botanical Publishing Board, 2011.
Mihál, Ivan. "Species diversity, abundance and dominance of macromycetes in beech forest stands with different intensity of shelterwood cutting interventions." (2008).
Hibbett, David S., and Manfred Binder. "Evolution of complex fruiting–body morphologies in homobasidiomycetes." Proceedings of the Royal Society of London B: Biological Sciences 269.1504 (2002): 1963–1969.

External links

MycoBank

Hymenochaetales
Fungi of China
Fungi described in 2009